Nahuel Molina Lucero (born 6 April 1998) is an Argentine professional footballer who plays as a right-back for La Liga club Atlético Madrid and the Argentina national team.

Club career
Molina is a youth export from Boca Juniors. On 18 February 2016, he made his first team debut in a league game against San Martín de San Juan. He played the full game.

Defensa y Justicia
In January 2018, Molina was loaned out to Defensa y Justicia for the rest of 2018. The next season he was loaned to Rosario Central where he found the continuity he needed to stand out and ended up returning to Boca Juniors at the start of 2019.

Udinese Calcio
On 15 September 2020, Molina joined Udinese Calcio on a free transfer until 2025.

Atlético Madrid
On 28 July 2022, Molina joined Atlético Madrid on a five-year deal, for a reported fee of €10 million and €5 million in variables.

International career
Molina made his debut for the Argentina national team on 3 June 2021 in a World Cup qualifier against Chile. He substituted Juan Foyth in the 81st minute.

Molina scored his first goal for Argentina on 9 December 2022, in their 2022 World Cup quarter-final match against the Netherlands. He previously assisted  to Alexis Mac Allister during their group stage match vs Poland. He started six matches for Argentina as first choice right back scoring one goal and providing one assist throughout the tournament en route to become champions.

Career statistics

Club

International

 Scores and results list Argentina's goal tally first, score column indicates score after each Molina goal.

Honours
Argentina
 FIFA World Cup: 2022
 Copa América: 2021
 CONMEBOL–UEFA Cup of Champions: 2022

References

External links

Profile at the Atlético Madrid website

1997 births
Living people
Argentine footballers
Argentina international footballers
Association football defenders
Boca Juniors footballers
Defensa y Justicia footballers
Rosario Central footballers
Udinese Calcio players
Atlético Madrid footballers
Argentine Primera División players
Serie A players
Argentine expatriate footballers
Argentine expatriate sportspeople in Italy
Expatriate footballers in Italy
Argentine expatriate sportspeople in Spain
Expatriate footballers in Spain
2021 Copa América players
2022 FIFA World Cup players
Copa América-winning players
FIFA World Cup-winning players